Triatoma juazeirensis is an assassin bug, a Chagas disease vector which occurs in the State of Bahia, Brazil. It is found in natural and artificial environments infesting mainly the peridomiciliary areas but it may also colonize the intradomicile. T. juazeirensis can be distinguished from the other members of the brasiliensis complex by its entire dark pronotum and legs.

References
 Costa J., Felix M. (2007).Triatoma juazeirensis sp. nov. from the state of Bahia, Northeastern Brazil (Hemiptera: Reduviidae: Triatominae). Memórias do Instituto Oswaldo Cruz 102(1): 87-90.
 Lent H., Wygodzinsky P. (1979). Revision of the Triatominae (Hemiptera, Reduviidae) and their significance as vectors of Chagas' disease. Bull Am Mus Nat Hist 163: 125-520.

Reduviidae
Insect vectors of human pathogens
Invertebrates of Brazil
Insects described in 2007